Carlo Monti (24 March 1920 – 7 April 2016) was an Italian athlete who competed mainly in the 100 metres. He won two medals, one individual and one relay, in international athletics competitions.

Biography
Monte competed for an Italy in the 1948 Summer Olympics held in London, Great Britain in the 4 x 100 metre relay where he won the bronze medal with his teammates Michele Tito, Enrico Perucconi and Antonio Siddi. In 1946 in the European Championships Monti won the bronze medal in the 100 metres.

Olympic results

National titles
Carlo Monti has won 8 times the individual national championship.
4 wins in the 100 metres (1940, 1941, 1946, 1947)
4 wins in the 200 metres (1941, 1942, 1946, 1949)

See also
 Italy national relay team

References

External links
 
 

1920 births
2016 deaths
Athletes from Milan
Italian male sprinters
Olympic bronze medalists for Italy
Athletes (track and field) at the 1948 Summer Olympics
Olympic athletes of Italy
European Athletics Championships medalists
Medalists at the 1948 Summer Olympics
Olympic bronze medalists in athletics (track and field)
Italian Athletics Championships winners